Don Browne is the president of Telemundo, an American Spanish-language television network based in Hialeah, Florida.

References

See also 

Telemundo
Living people
Year of birth missing (living people)